Events from the year 1985 in Taiwan, Republic of China. This year is numbered Minguo 74 according to the official Republic of China calendar.

Incumbents
 President – Chiang Ching-kuo
 Vice President – Lee Teng-hui
 Premier – Yu Kuo-hwa
 Vice Premier – Lin Yang-kang

Events

January
 5 January – The establishment of Institute of Transportation.

February
 9 February – the total amount of loans made by the Taipei 10th Credit Corporation(臺北十信) accounted for 102% of the total deposits. In order to protect the legitimate rights and interests of depositors, the Ministry of Finance ordered the cooperative to suspend business for three days, and temporarily took over the cooperation from the Taiwan Provincial Cooperative, strictly inspecting and rectifying the situation.

August
 1 August – The opening of Minghu Dam in Nantou County.
 27 August – The inauguration of Keelung City Cultural Center in Keelung.

October
 19 October – The start of the construction to expand Yunlin Prison in Huwei Township, Yunlin County.
 25 October – The opening of Zhongli Arts Hall in Taoyuan County (now Taoyuan City).

December
 31 December – The inauguration of Taipei World Trade Center in Xinyi District, Taipei.

Births
 8 January – Chan Chin-wei, tennis athlete
 10 January – Ko Chia-yen, actress
 15 January – Hush, singer
 22 January – Chen Cho-yi, swimmer
 26 January – Allison Lin, actress
 28 February – Lee Tai-lin, football athlete
 18 March – Chen Hui-shan, football goalkeeper
 6 April – Lu Ying-chi, weightlifting athlete
 11 May – Tia Lee, singer, actress and model
 20 June – Cheng Chi-hung, baseball player
 2 July – Renée Chen, singer and songwriter
 15 July – Crowd Lu, singer-songwriter and actor
 18 September – Amber An, model, singer and actress
 5 November – Ma Chih-hung, luge athlete
 20 November – Aaron Yan, model, actor and singer
 25 December – Chang Han, football athlete

Deaths
 12 March – Yang Kui, former writer.
 26 August – Chang Chi-yun, Minister of Education (1954–1958).
 2 September – Yu Ching-tang, Vice Premier (1963–1966).

References

 
Years of the 20th century in Taiwan